Staying at Tamara's is the second studio album by English singer-songwriter George Ezra. It was released on 23 March 2018. The album reached number one in the UK as well as the top ten of several other countries including Australia and New Zealand. The album includes the singles "Paradise" and "Shotgun", which peaked at number two and number one on the UK Singles Chart, respectively.

It was the UK's best-selling artist album of the year in 2018 and was nominated for British Album of the Year at the 2019 Brit Awards.

In support of the album, Ezra embarked on a 2018 world tour entitled, Staying at Tamara's Tour, mostly visiting cities across North America and Europe.

Background
Ezra finished touring his debut album Wanted on Voyage (2014) in December 2016. Following this, he realised that he "needed to write another record". He went to Barcelona for a month, but instead of booking a hotel or apartment, he found a stranger on the Internet whose name was Tamara. "[She] was renting her spare room," he told The Sydney Morning Herald. "I thought, if she's a bit crazy, if she's a bit unhinged, I can just leave. Her friends were all musicians, artists and designers and her apartment really felt like their HQ. It helped slow me down. There was a point about halfway through the trip where I was like, this trip has proved to be really important ... and the album's name came to me like that. I love it."

Singles
Five singles have been released from the album. "Don't Matter Now" was released as the lead single on 16 June 2017. It was a moderate success in Belgium, Iceland and the Netherlands and gave Ezra his seventh top 75 entry on the UK Singles Chart. The second single released from the album was "Paradise", which peaked at number two, being kept off the top spot by Rudimental's "These Days". It also reached the top ten in Ireland, Belgium, Austria and Scotland.

"Shotgun" was released as the third single from the album on 18 May 2018; it reached number one on the UK Singles Chart on 29 June 2018 and gave Ezra his first UK number-one single. "Hold My Girl" was released as the fourth single from the album in late-September. "Pretty Shining People" was released as the fifth single in early-March.

Promotional singles
"Pretty Shining People" was released as the first promotional single from the album on 2 March 2018; it reached number 54 on the UK Singles Chart.The track was later selected as the album's fifth single in March 2019. "Hold My Girl" was released as the second and final promotional single on 9 March 2018, and reached number 81 on the UK Singles Chart. The track was later selected as the album's fourth single, and impacted radio in September 2018.

Critical reception

At Metacritic, which assigns a normalised rating out of 100 to reviews from mainstream critics, the album has an average score of 61 based on seven reviews, indicating "generally favorable reviews".

Track listing

Charts

Weekly charts

Year-end charts

Decade-end charts

Certifications

References

2018 albums
George Ezra albums
Albums produced by Cam Blackwood
Albums produced by Fred Again